Coleophora onobrychiella is a moth of the family Coleophoridae. It is found from Sweden to the Pyrenees, Italy and Greece and from France to Romania. It is also found in China.

The wingspan is 14–15 mm.

The larvae feed on Astragalus arenarius, Astragalus hamosus, Astragalus onobrychis, Genista tincoria, Hippocrepis comosa, Onobrychis sativa, Onobrychis saxatilis, Onobrychis supina and Onobrychis viciifolia. They create a straw-coloured lobe case of 8–10 mm. It has a mouth angle of 55-60°. The shape of the case is exceptionally variable. The mouth opening is shifted to the side of the case, causing the case to lie on its side on the leaf. Larvae can be found from autumn to the following June.

References

omanica
Moths of Europe
Moths of Asia
Moths described in 1849